Mobeytiheh may refer to:
 Mobeytiheh 2
 Mobeytiheh 3